The 2013 Tour de Feminin – O cenu Ceského Švýcarska  , or 2013 Tour de Feminin – Krásná Lípa, was the 26th running of the Tour de Feminin – Krásná Lípa rated by the UCI as 2.2. Tour de Feminin – Krásná Lípa is a stage race based in the Czech Republic, which forms part of the 2013 women's road cycling calendar. It will be held over five stages from 4 July to 7 July 2013, starting in Krásná Lípa, in the Ústí nad Labem Region and concluding back in Krásná Lípa. The race will run over four stages and one individual time trial.

Stages

Stage 1
4 July 2013 –  Krásná Lípa to Krásná Lípa,

Stage 2
5 July 2013 – Jiříkov to Jirikov,

Stage 3
6 July 2013 – Bogatynia to Bogatynia, individual time trial (ITT)

Stage 4
6 July 2013 – Rumburk to Rumburk,

Stage 5
7 July 2013 – Varnsdorp to Krásná Lípa,

Classification progress

References

2013 in women's road cycling
2013 in Czech sport
International cycle races hosted by the Czech Republic